Hasan Toy (born April 18, 1994) is a Dutch-Turkish kickboxer.

Kickboxing career
Toy participated in the 2018 Wu Lin Feng 67 kilogram contender tournament, held at Wu Lin Feng 2018: World Championship Tianjin on March 3, 2018. After beating Feng Jie by unanimous decision in the semifinals, Toy faced Ilias Bulaid in the tournament finals. He won the fight by split decision.

Toy faced David Mejia at Wu Lin Feng 2018: WLF -67kg World Cup 2018-2019 2nd Round on August 4, 2018. He won the fight by decision. Toy was booked to face Liu Yaning at Wu Lin Feng 2018: WLF -67kg World Cup 2018-2019 4th Round on October 6, 2018. He won the fight by a second-round technical knockout. Toy next faced Diego Freitas at Wu Lin Feng 2018: WLF -67kg World Cup 2018-2019 6th Round on December 1, 2018. He won the fight by decision.

Toy faced Jomthong Chuwattana at Wu Lin Feng 2019: WLF World Cup 2018-2019 Final, in the semifinals of the 2019 WLF 67 kg World Cup. He lost the fight by unanimous decision.

Toy faced Masaaki Noiri at K-1 World GP 2019 Japan: ～Women's Flyweight Championship Tournament～ on December 28, 2019. He lost the fight by majority decision.

Titles and accomplishments

2015 World Fighting League -67 kg Tournament Champion
2016 WFCA -68 kg European Champion
2017 Wu Lin Feng -67 kg 4-man Tournament Champion

Professional kickboxing record

|-  style="background:#fbb;"
| 2019-12-28||Loss ||align=left| Masaaki Noiri ||  K-1 World GP 2019 Japan: ～Women's Flyweight Championship Tournament～ || Nagoya, Japan || Decision (Majority) || 3 || 3:00
|-  style="background:#fbb;"
| 2019-01-19 || Loss ||align=left| Jomthong Chuwattana ||Wu Lin Feng 2019: WLF World Cup 2018-2019 Final, Semi Final  || Haikou, China || Decision (Unanimous) || 3 || 3:00
|-  bgcolor="#CCFFCC"
| 2018-12-01|| Win ||align=left| Diego Freitas || Wu Lin Feng 2018: WLF -67kg World Cup 2018-2019 6th Round  || Zhengzhou, China || Decision || 3 || 3:00
|-  bgcolor="#CCFFCC"
| 2018-10-06|| Win ||align=left| Liu Yaning ||Wu Lin Feng 2018: WLF -67kg World Cup 2018-2019 4th Round || Shangqiu, China || TKO || 2 || 2:45
|-  bgcolor="#CCFFCC"
| 2018-08-04|| Win ||align=left| David Mejia || Wu Lin Feng 2018: WLF -67kg World Cup 2018-2019 2nd Round || Zhengzhou, China || Decision || 3 || 3:00
|-  bgcolor="#CCFFCC"
| 2018-03-03|| Win ||align=left| Ilias Bulaid || Wu Lin Feng 2018: World Championship Tianjin -67kg Contender Tournament Final || Tianjin, China || Decision (Split) || 3 || 3:00
|-  bgcolor="#CCFFCC"
| 2018-03-03|| Win ||align=left| Feng Jie || Wu Lin Feng 2018: World Championship Tianjin -67kg Contender Tournament Semi Final || Tianjin, China || Decision (Unanimous) || 3 || 3:00
|-  bgcolor="#fbb"
| 2018-01-27|| Loss ||align=left| Arbi Emiev || Mix Fight 24 || Turkey || Ext. R Decision (Split)|| 4 || 3:00
|-  bgcolor="#CCFFCC"
| 2017-12-14|| Win ||align=left| Martin Gaňo || Noc Válečníků 13 || Kladno, Czech Republic || KO (Left knee to the Body) || 3 ||
|-  bgcolor="#CCFFCC"
| 2017-12-02 || Win ||align=left| Vang Moua || Mix Fight Gala 23 || Frankfurt, Germany || Decision || 3 || 3:00
|-  bgcolor="#CCFFCC"
| 2017-11-04|| Win ||align=left| Zhong Weipeng || Wu Lin Feng 2017: Yi Long VS Sitthichai  || Kunming, China || TKO || 3 ||
|- style="background:#fbb;"
| 2017-07-01 || Loss || align="left| Sitthichai Sitsongpeenong || Wu Lin Feng - Yi Long challenge Tournament 1/4 finals 4 || Zhengzhou, China || Decision (Unanimous) || 3 || 3:00
|-  bgcolor="#c5d2ea"
| 2017-05-27|| Draw ||align=left| Edi Shehaj || Brothers Gym present : THE STORY || Germany || Decision || 3 || 3:00
|-  bgcolor="#CCFFCC"
| 2017-04-01|| Win ||align=left| Zhong Weipeng || Wu Lin Feng 2017: China VS Europe  || Zhengzhou, China || Decision || 3 || 3:00
|-  bgcolor="#CCFFCC"
| 2017-01-14|| Win ||align=left| Song Shaoqiu || Wu Lin Feng China vs Spain 70kg Tournament Reserve Fight || Zhengzhou, China || Decision (Unanimous) || 3 || 3:00
|-  style="background:#fbb;"
| 2016-11-18|| Loss ||align=left| Jo Nattawut || Lion Fight 33 || United States || Decision || 5 || 3:00
|-
! style=background:white colspan=9 |
|-  style="background:#fbb;"
| 2016-10-16|| Loss ||align=left| Walid Hamid || ACB KB 8: Only The Braves || Hoofddorp, Netherlands || Decision (Unanimous) || 3 || 3:00
|-  style="background:#CCFFCC;"
| 2016-09-03|| Win ||align=left| Yang Yulong || Wu Lin Feng 2016: Netherlands VS China || Shenzhen, China ||TKO (Front Kick) || 1 ||
|-  style="background:#fbb;"
| 2016-06-04 || Loss||align=left| Marouan Toutouh || King of The Ring || Netherlands ||  Decision  || 3 || 3:00
|-  style="background:#fbb;"
| 2016-04-23|| Loss ||align=left| Florian Markou || No Limits Star Wars || Greece || Decision|| 3 || 3:00
|-  style="background:#CCFFCC;"
| 2016-04-02|| Win ||align=left| Brown Pinas || Enfusion Live Gold Edition || The Hague, Netherlands || Decision|| 3 || 3:00
|-  style="background:#CCFFCC;"
| 2016-03-05|| Win ||align=left| Jan Julius Humme || The Battle Amsterdam vs Rotterdam || Netherlands || Decision (Unanimous)|| 3 || 3:00
|-  style="background:#CCFFCC;"
| 2016-01-24|| Win ||align=left| Mac Rakkong || No Guts No Glory 9 || China || Decision || 3 || 3:00
|-
! style=background:white colspan=9 |
|-  style="background:#CCFFCC;"
| 2015-12-05|| Win ||align=left| Liu Xiangming || Wu Lin Feng || China || TKO (Leg Injury)|| 2 ||
|-  style="background:#CCFFCC;"
| 2015-09-26|| Win||align=left| Albin Fajkovic || World Fighting League || Bosnia and Herzegovina || TKO (Doctor Stoppage/Cut)|| 1 || 2:00
|-  style="background:#fbb;"
| 2015-08|| Loss||align=left| Lu Jianbo || Wu Lin Feng || China || Decision|| 3 || 3:00
|-  style="background:#cfc;"
| 2015-05-30|| Win||align=left| Arthur Jaskul || Enfusion Rookies || Netherlands || Decision|| 3 || 3:00
|-  style="background:#CCFFCC;"
| 2015-04-12|| Win||align=left| Buray Bozaryilmaz|| World Fighting League, Final || Hoofddorp, Netherlands || TKO (Doctor Stoppage) originally a No Contest ||  ||
|-
! style=background:white colspan=9 |
|-  style="background:#CCFFCC;"
| 2015-04-12|| Win||align=left| Juan Javier Barragan|| World Fighting League, Semi Final || Hoofddorp, Netherlands || Decision || 3 || 3:00
|-  style="background:#fbb;"
| 2014-11-29|| Loss||align=left| Jan Julius || Enfusion Rookies || Netherlands || Ext.R Decision ||4 || 3:00
|-  style="background:#CCFFCC;"
| 2014-06-07|| Win||align=left| Marcel Verhaar || Fight Sense x Enfusion Rookies || Netherlands || KO || ||
|-  style="background:#fbb;"
| 2014-03-02|| Loss ||align=left| Edson Fortes || The Heat is On || Rotterdam, Netherlands || Decision|| 3|| 3:00
|-  style="background:#fbb;"
| 2013-11-02|| Loss ||align=left| Ismael Benali || Bari Gym Event || Noordwijkerhout, Netherlands ||Decision || 5 || 3:00
|-  bgcolor=#CCFFCC
| 2013-10-10 || Win||align=left| Tigran Movsisyan || Fight Fans VI || Netherlands || Decision || 3 || 3:00
|-  style="background:#fbb;"
| 2013-09-22|| Loss ||align=left| Aziz Kallah || Students of the Game || Haarlem, Netherlands ||Decision || 5 || 3:00
|-  style="background:#CCFFCC;"
| 2013-03-23|| Win ||align=left|  ||  ||  Netherlands || KO (High Kick)|| 3 ||
|-
| colspan=9 | Legend:

See also
 List of male kickboxers

References

1994 births
Living people
Dutch male kickboxers
Turkish male kickboxers
People from Kayseri